Nivedita Sambha Mane (born 11 April 1963) is a politician associated with NCP and Shiv Sena. She was a member of the 14th Lok Sabha of India. She represented the Ichalkaranji constituency of Maharashtra for two terms 1999 and 2004, as a member of the Nationalist Congress Party. In 2009 polls, she lost to Raju Shetty in Hatkanangle.

On 10 January 2017, Mane, along with NCP MP Dhananjay Mahadik, NCP MLA Hasan Mushrif, Kolhapur mayor Hasina Faras, and 400 others were arrested for blocking traffic on the Pune-Bengaluru National Highway as part of a protest against the effects of demonetization.

Her son Dhairyasheel Sambha Mane was elected to Lok Sabha from Hatkanangle in 2019.

Positions held
 1999: Elected to 13th Lok Sabha (1st term) from Ichalkaranji 
 2004: Elected to 14th Lok Sabha (2nd term) 
 2015: Elected as Director of Kolhapur district central cooperative Bank

References

External links
 Members Bioprofile in Parliament of India website

Living people
1963 births
People from Kolhapur
India MPs 2004–2009
Marathi politicians
India MPs 1999–2004
Nationalist Congress Party politicians from Maharashtra
Lok Sabha members from Maharashtra
Women in Maharashtra politics
21st-century Indian women politicians
21st-century Indian politicians
20th-century Indian women politicians
20th-century Indian politicians
Shiv Sena politicians
Women members of the Lok Sabha